Alvaro Salas (born May 25, 1953 in Montevideo, Uruguay) is a Uruguayan  Master Candombe drummer and percussion teacher.

Early life
Salas was born in Ansina, a neighbourhood in  Palermo, Montevideo.

Career in music industry
Salas has worked, both live and on records, with a number of musicians, including Eduardo Mateo,  Jorginho Gularte, Roberto Galletti, Federico Britos, and Urbano Moraes. He has also worked as a percussionist, arranger, and director with several award-winning Carnival groups including Marabunta, Sueno del Buceo, Vendaval, and others. He is the current Director of Afro-Uruguayan social organization Mundo Afro. As well, he runs the musical school in this institution, which has international prestige. In 2018, he worked with Kamba Kuá in celebrating afro-Paraguayan identity at the "Agustin Pio Barrios" music school at the new Municipal Art Institute (IMA, in Spanish). He demonstrates the interaction between the typical percussive family of candombe, consisting of what are known as the piano, chico and repique drum.

References

External links
  An Exploration of Afro-Uruguayan Music and Culture
Former Travel Grant Recipient Brings Uruguayan Musicians to Miami

See also
Candombe

1953 births
Uruguayan percussionists
Uruguayan male musicians
Jazz percussionists
Latin jazz percussionists
Conga players
Living people
Uruguayan educators
People from Montevideo
Civil rights activists